Azlan Mohd Lazim is the father of Saiful Bukhari Azlan, primarily known for his involvement in the Anwar Ibrahim sodomy trials. In June 2008, Saiful alleged that Leader of Opposition of Malaysia Anwar Ibrahim, to whom Saiful was a former aide, had forcibly sodomised him, eventually attesting to this in an oath that took place in the Federal Territory Mosque in August 2008 with Azlan as his witness. However, in March 2013, Azlan publicly retracted all allegations against Anwar, stating that the then Prime Minister Abdullah Ahmad Badawi's Department had used him and Saiful to implicate Anwar. In May 2013, he again changed his statement and retracted his March 2013 statement saying that what happened to Saiful was 'real' and not a political conspiracy against Anwar.

Anwar Ibrahim sodomy issues

Sumpah Laknat — "Swearing in the face of divine retribution" 
Azlan Mohd Lazim was seen accompanying his son Saiful Bukhari Azlan to court in Kuala Lumpur on 10 February 2010. Retrieved 11 March 2013.

Defending his son's statement 
Azlan urged Suhakam to review the sodomy case involving his son and the opposition leader Anwar Ibrahim. Azlan asked Suhakam to expedite the process, as the case would soon become obsolete without the assistance of an independent body. He stated that he believed his son was a victim and that justice must prevail at any cost.

Azlan made a statement saying that he was annoyed and displeased with Anwar Ibrahim stalling the judicial process.

Urging the Attorney General to appeal 
He also urged the Attorney General to file an appeal against Anwar Ibrahim's acquittal, as it was based on legal technicalities. He further expressed that without said technicalities Anwar Ibrahim would still be in prison.

Changing his statement 
Despite previous statements, Azlan revoked all of his claims and apologised to Anwar Ibrahim and his family for accusing him of sodomising his son. Azlan pointed to the accusation of Anwar Ibrahim's sodomy charges as the works of individuals within the Prime Minister's Department. This drew criticism from both pro-government and pro-opposition supporters.

Perak Grand Mufti Harussani claims that Azlan may have committed perjury; Azlan has "committed a grievous sin by coming out with a baldfaced lie". The mufti pointed out that Azlan had feverishly fought to defend his son, but then changed his statement. Azlan's credibility is now in question, as he may have been a false witness.

Noh Omar, The Malaysian Agriculture and Agro-Based Industry Minister, is prompting the public to question Azlan's credibility, as he is telling stories that would influence the appeal to his son's case. Perak Menteri Besar Zambri rebutted that the apology made by Azlan to Anwar Ibrahim seems orchestrated, a diversion from the Lahad Datu issue in which Anwar is stated to be directly involved.

Saiful's reaction 
Saiful was apparently baffled as to why his father made the retraction. Saiful squarely places the blame on Anwar for allegedly manipulating his father into becoming his pawn "all to satiate the PKR de facto leader's political avarice." Saiful has responded with a press statement from his lawyer's office in Hartamas. He was visibly choked with emotion when journalists asked him about his father retracting the statement he had made all these years and giving his full support to Anwar Ibrahim. Saiful mentioned that he had tried to call his father to ask what was going on, but his father was unreachable.

References 

Living people
Malaysian politicians
Year of birth missing (living people)